Brill Building (also known as Brill Building pop or the Brill Building sound) is a subgenre of pop music that took its name from the Brill Building in New York City, where numerous teams of professional songwriters penned material for girl groups and teen idols during the early 1960s. The term has also become a metonym for the period in which those songwriting teams flourished. In actuality, most hits of the mid-1950s and early 1960s were written elsewhere.

Overview

The music conceived at the Brill Building was more sophisticated than other pop styles of the time, combining contemporary sounds with classic Tin Pan Alley songwriting. Productions often featured orchestras and bands with large rhythm and guitar sections, while its lyrics focused on idealized romance and adolescent anxieties, only rarely exploring more mature themes.

The genre dominated the American charts in the period between Elvis Presley's army enlistment in 1958 and the onset of the British Invasion in 1964. It declined thereafter, but demonstrated a continued influence on British and American pop and rock music in subsequent years, having introduced the concept of professional songwriters to traditional pop and early rock and roll, and helping to inspire the girl group craze of the era. Other reasons for the style's decline was a tendency among writers and producers to duplicate earlier successes, resulting in many records that sounded the same, as well the changing nature of society and consumer markets. Many of the genre's composers went on to further success as part of the singer-songwriter movement later in the 1960s and 1970s.

List of artists
1960s artists/songwriters

Later artists
 Roy Wood

References

Bibliography
 

Pop music genres
American styles of music
Music of New York City
20th-century music genres
1960s in American music